Bipasha Basu is an Indian Actress who appears in Hindi language films. She has also worked in Telugu, Bengali and Tamil language films.

She debuted in a negative role in Ajnabee (2001) which earned her the Filmfare Award for Best Female Debut. Her first commercial success was Raaz (2002). She was then noticed for her bold role in the erotic thriller film, Jism (2003). She starred in top-grossing films like – No Entry (2005), Phir Hera Pheri, Dhoom 2 (both 2006) – her biggest commercial success till date and Race (2008). Her performances in Apharan (2005), Corporate (2006) and Bachna Ae Haseeno (2008) won her multiple nominations for several awards. She then appeared in commercially successful films such as All the Best: Fun Begins (2009), Raaz 3 (2012). She made her international film debut with the 2013 Australian film The Lovers. She was one of the leading and highest-paid actresses of Bollywood from 2000-2009.

She has been nominated twice for the Filmfare Award for Best Actress and the Filmfare Award for Best Supporting Actress three times along with one nomination for the Filmfare Award for Best Performance in a Negative Role. Roles apart, she is renowned for her item songs like "Phoonk De" in No Smoking (2007), and "Beedi" and "Namak Ishq Ka" in Omkara (2006) amongst others.

Filmfare Awards

Stardust Awards

Star Screen Awards

Zee Cine Awards

International Indian Film Academy Awards

Bollywood Movie Awards

Star Guild Award

BIG Star Entertainment Award

Indian Film Festival of Melbourne

Anandalok Puraskar Awards

Other Awards and Recognitions

Footnotes 

Lists of awards received by Indian actor